Michel-Rostislav Hofmann (28 August 1915 – 19 March 1975 in Paris) was a Franco-Russian writer, musicologist and translator.

A translator of Russian into French, notably from Alexander Pushkin, Ivan Turgenev and Leo Tolstoy. He was also a musicologist and connoisseur of Russian music.

His name is often distorted in bibliographic sources : « M. et R. Hofman », « Borislav Hoffman » etc.

Works 
1946: Un siècle d'opéra russe : de Glinka à Stravinsky.
1953: Petite histoire de la musique russe.
1953: Serge Lifar et son ballet.
1957: La Musique en Russie : des origines à nos jours.
1958: Rimski-Korsakov : sa vie, son œuvre.
1959: Histoire de la musique des origines à nos jours
1959: Tchaïkovski, Éditions du Seuil (Solfèges series, No. 11)
1962: Sur le sentier de la musique.
1963: Dimitri Chostakovitch, l'homme et son œuvre.
1964: Serge Prokofiev, l'homme et son œuvre.
1964: La Vie de Moussorgski
1965: La Vie de Schubert
1965: Les Grandes Figures slaves de Russie.
1965: La Vie des grands musiciens russes.
1966: Musique mon amie.
1967: Les Grands romanciers russes.
1968: Histoire de la musique russe: des origines à nos jours (Éditions Buchet/Chastel)
1973: Petite histoire de la musique russe : des origines à Stravinsky,

References

External links 
 Michel-Rostislav HOFMANN on Encyclopédie Universalis
 Michel-Rostislav Hofmann on Diskogs

Russian writers in French
1915 births
1975 deaths
Russian–French translators
20th-century French musicologists
French biographers
20th-century translators